Bone Against Steel is the ninth studio album by the southern rock band 38 Special, released in 1991. It was their last album until their 1996 comeback and the last album to feature the vocalist and keyboard player Max Carl. It would also be their last album with long time guitarist and founding member Jeff Carlisi.

The album itself was a modest commercial success and only reached #170 on the Billboard 200 album chart. However, the single "The Sound of Your Voice" (also known as "Sound of Your Voice"), was a major hit, and one of three songs co-written by Survivor's Jim Peterik for the album. The song, with a vocal hook in the chorus very reminiscent of Survivor's "I Can't Hold Back", reached #2 on the Billboard Mainstream Rock chart and #33 on the Billboard Hot 100 (their last Top 40 hit and last appearance on that chart to date), while the second of the three Peterik songs, "Rebel to Rebel", only reached #30 on the Billboard Mainstream Rock chart.

Track listing
"The Sound of Your Voice" (Max Carl, Jeff Carlisi, Danny Chauncey, Jim Peterik) – 4:58
"Signs of Love" (Carl) – 4:49
"Last Thing I Ever Do" (Carlisi, Chauncey, Robert White Johnson, Michael Lunn, Donnie Van Zant) – 5:22
"You Definitely Got Me" (Carl, Carlisi, Chauncey) – 5:12
"Rebel to Rebel" (Carlisi, Peterik, Van Zant) – 5:33
"Bone Against Steel" (Carl) – 5:24
"You Be the Dam, I'll Be the Water" (Carl, Johnson, Van Stephenson, Van Zant) – 4:26
"Jimmy Gillum" (Carl, Carlisi, Chauncey, Van Zant) – 5:07
"Tear It Up" (Carl, Carlisi, Chauncey) – 4:39
"Don't Wanna Get It Dirty" (Johnson, Lunn, Van Zant) – 4:36
"Burning Bridges" (Carl, Carlisi, Chauncey) – 4:45
"Can't Shake It" (Johnson, Lunn, Van Zant) – 3:29
"Treasure" (Carl, Carlisi, Peterik) – 5:40

Personnel

.38 Special 
 Max Carl – keyboards, vocals
 Jeff Carlisi – guitars
 Danny Chauncey – guitars
 Larry Junstrom – bass
 Jack Grondin – drums
 Donnie Van Zant – vocals

Guest musicians 
 Scott Meeder – drum programming, percussion, cymbals 
 Michael Hoskin – alto saxophone, baritone saxophone
 Larry Jackson – tenor saxophone
 Gordon Vernick – trumpet
 The Six Groomers (the band) – backing vocals 
 Robert White Johnson – backing vocals
 Jack Blades – backing vocals (9)
 Brian Howe – backing vocals (9)

Production 
 Rodney Mills – producer, recording, mixing 
 Tag George – recording assistant, mix assistant 
 Edd Miller – recording assistant
 Phil Tan – recording assistant
 Bob Ludwig – mastering 
 Masterdisk (New York City, New York) – mastering location 
 Mark Rogers – tape operation 
 Norman Moore – art direction, design 
 John Halpern – band photography 
 Peter Miller – cover photography

Charts
Album – Billboard (United States)

Singles – Billboard (United States)

References

38 Special (band) albums
1991 albums
Charisma Records albums
Albums produced by Rodney Mills